Oxya japonica, the Japanese grasshopper, is a species of short-horned grasshopper in the family Acrididae. It is found in Indomalaya and eastern Asia.

Subspecies
These subspecies belong to the species Oxya japonica:
 Oxya japonica japonica (Thunberg, 1815)
 Oxya japonica vitticollis (Blanchard, 1853)

References

External links

 

japonica